The Ambassador Extraordinary and Plenipotentiary of the Russian Federation to the Kingdom of Saudi Arabia is the official representative of the President and the Government of the Russian Federation to the King and the Government of Saudi Arabia.

The ambassador and his staff work at large in the Embassy of Russia in Riyadh. There is a Consulate General in Jeddah.

History of diplomatic relations

The Soviet Union was the first country to recognize and establish full diplomatic relations with Kingdom of Saudi Arabia in 1926. Karim Khakimov was the first ambassador to the kingdom. He visited King Ibn Saud's residence and delivered a formal note recognizing and approving his status as a King of Saudi Arabia from the Soviet Union and its allies. Karim Khakimov was also known as the Russian Lawrence of Arabia. His mission was terminated in July 1928 but he was again appointed ambassador on December 7, 1935 and remained so until September 6, 1937. When Khakimov returned to the Soviet Union he was executed on the order of Soviet leader Joseph Stalin in 1938 on suspicion of espionage. Khakimov's execution greatly angered Ibn Saud, who referred to Khakimov as his closest friend. The relations between the two states deteriorated and the embassy in Riyadh was closed, with Soviet Muslims prevented from attending hajj. This lasted until 1990, when relations were re-established and restrictions on the Soviet pilgrimages were also removed. Gennady Pavlovich Tarasov was appointed as the new ambassador to the Kingdom of Saudi Arabia.

List of representatives (1924 - present)

Representatives of the Soviet Union to Saudi Arabia (1924 – 1991)

Representatives of the Russian Federation to Saudi Arabia (1991 – present)

See also 
Foreign relations of Saudi Arabia

References

External links 

 
Saudi Arabia
Russia